"Cleaning Up" is the twelfth and penultimate episode of the first season of the HBO original series The Wire. The episode was written by George Pelecanos from a story by David Simon & Ed Burns and was directed by Clement Virgo. It originally aired on September 1, 2002.

Plot summary

Stringer collects the pagers belonging to D'Angelo's crew and tells them that all business talk will be conducted face to face. Stringer and Avon meet with Levy, who tells them that they need to walk away from Orlando's club, as well as clean up any other 'loose ends' that might be sources of information for the police. Levy also suggests that Nakeesha Lyles, a female security guard who had planned to testify against D'Angelo, may be a problem. After Levy departs, Stringer convinces Avon to insulate himself from their crew by passing all communication through him. D'Angelo tells Stringer that Wallace has left "the game" and appeals to Avon to leave him alone. Back at the pit, Wallace returns and asks for his old position back. Bodie tells Wallace that he would have to accept a demotion, but D'Angelo overrules him. D'Angelo's mother Brianna arrives with a lunch for him.

Daniels visits Greggs and bumps into a drunken McNulty outside of her room. He tells McNulty to either see Greggs or go back to work. McNulty confesses that he is wracked with guilt over his role in starting the detail, saying that the case does not mean anything. Daniels tells him that the case meant something to Greggs and that they must continue their work and find her shooters. McNulty returns to the detail office as Freamon fits Shardene with contact lenses. Freamon tells McNulty that their surveillance is faltering because the Barksdale Organization is changing its operating procedure. He has sent Prez to Annapolis to chase the paper trail in campaign contributions. Freamon suggests that they have Shardene wear a wire in Avon's club.

Daniels meets with Burrell and Reed to discuss his investigation. Burrell feels that the case is over now that the wiretaps have gone dead. Daniels argues that they should keep up the surveillance as they still have time remaining on the court order. Burrell orders Daniels to return Santangelo and Sydnor to Homicide, but allows him to keep Freamon and Prez. Burrell still assumes Freamon and Prez are the most useless detectives on his detail, unaware that they have revealed themselves to Daniels as valuable investigators. Pearlman meets with the State's Attorney, who is worried about the political angle in the Barksdale investigation. He gives Pearlman evidence of returned contributions from unknown sources from his own offices to hand over to the detail. Pearlman is distressed that the investigation is worrying her superiors, as this reflects poorly on her, and she denies any knowledge of the detail's actions.

Shardene attempts to infiltrate the office at Orlando's while wearing a wire but has little success in obtaining pertinent information. Later that night, beat officers find Nakeesha's body. Bunk reports the murder to Daniels, and they realize that Wallace may be in danger. Daniels scrambles to organize his men to locate him while Freamon offers to let Shardene stay at his apartment. Daniels is called into a meeting with Burrell and Senator Davis, who is concerned about the detail looking into his campaign finances and his driver. Daniels refuses to apologize for the driver's arrest and tells Davis that if he is clean, he has nothing to worry about. After Daniels leaves the meeting, Davis insists that Burrell needs to control him. Daniels returns to the office and learns that Wallace has left his grandmother's house. Freamon trains Shardene in measuring her steps to map the inside of the club. Using Prez's math skills, the detail installs a camera in Avon's office from an adjacent building.

Stringer orders Bodie to kill Wallace, and Poot unsuccessfully tries to dissuade him from doing so. McNulty and Daniels visit Wallace's old squat but find it abandoned. McNulty finds an address for Wallace's mother, Darcia, and he takes Daniels there to see if she knows his whereabouts. She is little help and is more concerned about her next drink than her son being in danger. After bringing Chinese takeout to the young children whom he looks after, Wallace goes out for a meal with Bodie and Poot. When they return home, the children have all left. Bodie and Poot corner Wallace in his bedroom and Bodie draws his weapon. He steels himself to shoot Wallace as he pleads for his life but is unable to do so until prompted by Poot. After the first shot, Poot takes the weapon and finishes the task. Bunk investigates Wallace's murder the next day while Avon clears his office at Orlando's, frustrating the detail.

Avon asks D'Angelo to drive to New York to receive their next package. With this information, Daniels and McNulty borrow a tracking device from the FBI and install it on D'Angelo's car. D'Angelo is stopped by the New Jersey State Police and brought in by the detail, after which McNulty and Daniels interrogate him without a lawyer. D'Angelo refuses to believe McNulty when he says that Wallace is dead. However, he is enraged when Stringer doesn't answer his questions about Wallace, accepting McNulty's story and refusing to let Levy represent him. Meanwhile, Burrell pressures Daniels to close the case and ignore the political leads, threatening to release the FBI's report on his excess capital. Daniels counters by stating that he is willing to go down for the sake of the Barksdale case, noting that the bad publicity is what Burrell is most afraid of.

McNulty and Daniels watch a SWAT team prepare to arrest Avon. McNulty tells Daniels that they should make the arrest themselves, and they go in together. Daniels cuffs Avon but McNulty lets Stringer go, telling him that they will catch him later. At the office, Freamon, Prez, and Sydnor review the board. Freamon adds a newspaper article about a downtown business revitalization project being built in an area where the Barksdales have been amassing property. Sydnor tells them that the case is the best work that he has ever done, but he still feels that it is not finished. At the pit, the dealers' orange sofa stands unused.

Production

Title reference
The title refers to the cleaning up of loose ends performed by the Barksdale crew, as recommended by their lawyer Maurice Levy, as well as that of the police, who are forced to bring in the case in the wake of the effects of "The Hunt" that interfered with their case due to the resulting changes made by the Barksdale organization.

Epigraph

The epigraph is spoken by Wallace as he discusses his return to "the pit" with D'Angelo, explaining why he cannot stay in the countryside, and why he can't move to another part of Baltimore. This is because everything that he is has been molded into his part of the drug dealing institution of "the pit", meaning that he is stuck in the life the institution forced him into.

Music
The song playing during the conversation between Bodie and Stringer Bell is "Hip Hop", from the album Black on Both Sides by Mos Def.

Credits

Starring cast
Although credited, John Doman, Seth Gilliam, Andre Royo, and Sonja Sohn do not appear in this episode.

Guest stars

First appearances
Brianna Barksdale: D'Angelo's mother and Avon's sister who is fully aware of their business.

Reception
The Futon Critic named it the fifth best episode of 2002, saying "You'd be hard pressed to find a harder to watch sequence than this one in 2002 as Poot and Bodie have to step up and get rid of the gentle and kind-hearted Wallace. I get the shivers just thinking about it." Alan Sepinwall wrote in The Star-Ledger in 2008 that the episode is considered by many "fans to be the series' best -- and most painful -- episode ever." Sepinwall wrote that Wallace's death was the first of the show's "many great tragedies...and still the one that probably cuts deepest."

References

External links
"Cleaning Up" at HBO.com

The Wire (season 1) episodes
2002 American television episodes